Tze Leung Lai (born June 28, 1945 in Hong Kong) is an American statistician. As of 2020, he is the Ray Lyman Wilbur Professor of Statistics at Stanford University.

He received his bachelor's degree from the University of Hong Kong in 1967. He received an M.A. in 1970 and a Ph.D. in 1971 in Mathematical Statistics from Columbia University.

He has supervised over 70 doctoral theses.

Honors and awards
He received the COPSS Presidents' Award in 1983. He was also awarded a Guggenheim fellowship the same year.

He is a fellow of the American Statistical Association and the Institute of Mathematical Statistics.

References

External links
 Stanford homepage

Living people
American statisticians
Stanford University Department of Statistics faculty
Columbia Graduate School of Arts and Sciences alumni
Alumni of the University of Hong Kong
Fellows of the American Statistical Association
Fellows of the Institute of Mathematical Statistics
1945 births